is a 2003 Japanese film written and directed by Japanese film director Sabu to showcase the Japanese boy band V6. The film involves usual Sabu elements such as high-speed car chases and yakuza.

Plot
The story follows three pairs of characters, all of whom are fleeing an illegal Thai boxing match.

The first characters shown are two restaurant workers. One persuades the other to take part in the boxing match, in place of an absent boxer. Although the bout was rigged to end in his defeat in the second round, he knocks his opponent out within seconds of the start. The pair are soon involved in a high-speech car chase with angered members of the yakuza.

The second pair of characters are two young businessmen who choose to eat at the restaurant where the boxing match is takes place, unaware of its yakuza connections. They flee the after a police raid and are involved in a high-speed car-chase with a patrol car.

The third pair of characters are in need of money to pay for damage they caused to a yakuza's expensive car. They attend the bout to steal the takings but one of them is shot and his friend drives him around in search of a hospital.

The three cars containing the six main characters crash and the postscript shows them sometime later, apparently enjoying successful lives.

External links
 

2003 films
Films directed by Sabu
2000s Japanese-language films
2003 action comedy films
Japanese action comedy films
Yakuza films
2000s Japanese films
2003 comedy films